Marta may refer to:

People 
 Marta (given name), a feminine given name
 Märta, a feminine given name
 Marta (surname)
István Márta composer
 Marta (footballer) (born 1986), Brazilian professional footballer

Places 
 Marta (river), an Italian river that flows into the Tyrrhenian Sea
 Marta, Lazio, a comune in Italy
 Marta, Nepal, a village development committee

Arts and entertainment 
 Marta (film), a 1971 Spanish film
 "Marta" (Ricardo Arjona song), non-charting
 "Marta", a song by Alejandra Guzmán, from the album Indeleble
 "Marta" (Nena Daconte song) a song by Nena Daconte, No.6 in Spain
 "Marta, Rambling Rose of the Wildwood", 1931 song by Arthur Tracy
 "Marta," a song composed by Moisés Simons

MARTA 
 Metropolitan Atlanta Rapid Transit Authority, the principal rapid-transit system in the Atlanta metropolitan area
 Mountain Area Regional Transit Authority, the third largest regional transit agency in San Bernardino County, California
 MARTa Herford, a contemporary art museum in Herford, Germany

Other uses 
 Battle of Marta, a Moorish victory over the Byzantines in North Africa in 547

See also 
 
 Martha (disambiguation)